Vitus Huonder (born 21 April 1942) is a Swiss prelate of the Catholic Church who was bishop of Chur from 2007 to 2019.

Vitus Huonder was born in Trun on 21 April 1942. He studied at the Pontifical Atheneum Saint Anselm and at the University of Fribourg, earning a licentiate in theology. He was ordained a priest of the diocese of Chur on 25 September 1971 and then continued his studies, earning a doctorate in theology in Fribourg. He became  vicar general of Chur in 1998.

Pope Benedict XVI appointed him bishop of Chur on 8 July 2007. He received his episcopal consecration on 8 September 2007 from Amédée Grab, his predecessor as bishop of Chur. His tenure proved controversial to some, as he reaffirmed orthodox Catholic doctrine in strong and uncompromising terms.

Pope Francis accepted his resignation on 20 May 2019. Huonder then chose to live out his retirement in an Society of Saint Pius X house, with papal authorization, where he intends to live a quiet and prayerful life, celebrate the Tridentine Mass, and work for tradition, which he sees as the only means of restoration of the Church.

References

External links

1942 births
Living people
Bishops of Chur
Bishops appointed by Pope Benedict XVI
People from Surselva District
Swiss traditionalist Catholics
21st-century Roman Catholic bishops in Switzerland